Babu Brish Bhan was a freedom fighter and the last Chief Minister and one and only deputy chief minister of PEPSU.

He completed his law from Law College Lahore in 1932. In 1951 and then in 1954 he became the deputy chief minister under the chief ministership of Raghbir Singh. After the death of Raghbir Singh he became the Chief Minister in 1955.

After the merger of PEPSU with Punjab State on 1 November 1956 following the States Reorganisation Act, he became the member of Punjab Legislative Assembly in 1962 from Sunam Assembly Constituency and then in 1967 from Lehra Assembly Constituency.

He died on 29 April 1988 and the Babu Brish Bhan DAV School at Moonak in Sangrur district is named after him.

References

Punjab, India politicians
1908 births
1988 deaths
People from Punjab, India
Deputy chief ministers of Punjab, India
Indian National Congress politicians from Punjab, India